Rosie Sutton (born 19 January 1990) is an Australian soccer player, who plays for Brisbane Roar in the Australian W-League. She has previously played for Perth Glory, Adelaide United, Western Sydney Wanderers, and Melbourne Victory in the Australian W-League as for ÍBV in the Icelandic Úrvalsdeild kvenna.

Club career

Perth Glory

ÍBV

Adelaide United
In 2015, Sutton joined Adelaide United after a stint with Queensland team Eastern Suburbs.

Return to Perth Glory

Western Sydney Wanderers

Melbourne Victory
After sitting out the 2018–19 season, Sutton joined Melbourne Victory in October 2019.

Brisbane Roar
In November 2020, Sutton joined Brisbane Roar ahead of the 2020–21 W-League season.

References

External links

1990 births
Living people
Australian women's soccer players
Perth Glory FC (A-League Women) players
Adelaide United FC (A-League Women) players
Western Sydney Wanderers FC (A-League Women) players
Melbourne Victory FC (A-League Women) players
Brisbane Roar FC (A-League Women) players
A-League Women players
Women's association football forwards
Rosie Sutton
People from Tweed Heads, New South Wales
Sportswomen from New South Wales
Soccer players from New South Wales